This is a list of the most serious U.S. rail-related accidents (excluding intentional acts such as the 1939 City of San Francisco derailment).

19th century

1830s
1833 Hightstown rail accident, Hightstown, New Jersey; 2 killed plus 15 injured. Earliest recorded train accident involving the death of passengers.
1837 Seaboard and Roanoke Railroad collision, Suffolk, Virginia; 3 killed plus dozens injured. Later in the year, a second accident resulted in ten injuries, with two of them ultimately dying.

1850s
1853 Greater Grand Crossing, Chicago Train Wreck, Grand Crossing (now Chicago), Illinois; 18 killed plus 40 injured. Eventually led to massive triple level grade separation project on Chicago's South Side
1853 Norwalk rail accident, Norwalk, Connecticut; 48 killed plus 30 injured. First movable bridge disaster in U.S. history and Connecticut's deadliest rail disaster to date
1853 Providence and Worcester head-on collision, Valley Falls, Rhode Island; 14 killed plus 17 injured. Rhode Island's deadliest rail disaster is also the first known to be photographed
1855 Gasconade Bridge train disaster, Gasconade, Missouri; 35+ killed plus hundreds injured. First deadly rail bridge collapse in U.S. history
1856 Great Train Wreck of 1856, Whitemarsh Township, Pennsylvania; 60+ killed plus 100+ injured. Encouraged busier railroads in the Eastern U.S. to double track lines; also led to mandatory use of telegraph in cases of delays
1859 South Bend train wreck, Mishawaka/South Bend, Indiana; 42 killed plus 50 injured

1860s
1863 Chunky Creek Train Wreck, Hickory, Mississippi; ~75 killed plus ~25 injured. All but one of the dead were Confederate reinforcements headed for Vicksburg, with the disaster--Mississippi's deadliest rail disaster to date--further hindering the city's defenses against Union forces
1864 Shohola train wreck, Shohola Township, Pennsylvania; ~65 killed plus many more injured. One of the trains was carrying Confederate POWs and Union guards, and citizens of Shohola and nearby Barryville, New York, treated the wounded 'without regard to the colour of their uniforms'
1867 Angola Horror, Angola, New York; 49 killed. Led to the standardization of track gauges in the U.S., as well as advancements in coach brake and heating systems

1870s
1871 Wappinger Creek trestle disaster, New Hamburg, New York; 22 confirmed killed plus scores unaccounted for. May have a higher number of missing victims than any other U.S. rail disaster to date
1871 Great Revere train wreck, Revere, Massachusetts; ~30 killed. Victims' and families' crippling lawsuits against the company at fault—the Eastern Railroad—led to its forced merger with arch rival, the Boston & Maine
1876 Ashtabula River Railroad Disaster, Ashtabula/Edgewood, Ohio; 92 killed plus 64 injured. The deadliest U.S. rail disaster of the 19th century--also Ohio's deadliest to date--led to changes in bridge construction code, the replacement of coal and wood stoves with steam heat in coaches, and mandatory federal investigation of all U.S. rail disasters
1877 Pickering Valley wreck, Kimberton, Pennsylvania; 7 killed plus dozens injured. Led Pennsylvania's Supreme Court to formulate a rule that when a railroad accepts money from passengers, an implied contract of care upon the part of the company arises; thus negligence is presumed on the part of the railroad if a passenger is injured
1878 Tariffville train crash, Tariffville, Connecticut; 13 killed plus 70+ injured. Death toll might have been worse if not for what was possibly the first emergency phone call in history
1878 Wollaston disaster, Quincy, Massachusetts; 19 killed and 170 injured

1880s
1883 Tehachapi train wreck, Tehachapi, California; 15 killed plus 12 injured. Fatalities included a former congressman and the wife of a former governor, who himself was injured
1886 Deerfield railway accident, Deerfield, Massachusetts; 11 killed and 36 injured.
1886 Silver Creek train wreck, Silver Creek, New York; ~15 killed plus ~15 injured
1887 West Hartford Bridge Disaster, Hartford, Vermont, 37 Killed plus 50 injured. Remains the state of Vermont's deadliest rail disaster to date
1887 Forest Hills disaster, Boston, Massachusetts; 38 killed plus 40 injured. Possibly the first known U.S. rail disaster to result from a case of fraud
1887 Great Chatsworth Train Wreck, Chatsworth Township, Illinois; ~85 killed plus hundreds injured. Illinois's deadliest rail disaster to date widely encouraged the use of newer steel coaches over conventional wooden ones
1887 Chicago and Atlantic Railway Wreck, Kouts, Indiana; 10 killed
1888 Wreck at the Fat Nancy, Orange County, Virginia; 9 killed plus 26 injured. Ironically, one of the dead was a civil engineer who designed a proposed culvert to replace the unstable trestle that collapsed
1888 Mud Run disaster, Kidder Township, Pennsylvania; 64 killed plus 50 injured. Devastated a generation of the local Irish-American communities

1890s
1890 Quincy train wreck, Quincy, Massachusetts; 23 killed plus 29 injured
1891 Great Kipton Train Wreck, Kipton, Ohio; 9 killed. Led to the adoption of stringent quality-control standards for railroad chronometers
1891 Bostian's Bridge train disaster, Statesville, North Carolina; 25-30 killed plus 25-30 injured. Several incidents of individuals reportedly hearing wails and moans at this location on the anniversary of the disaster have made Bostian's Bridge popular with paranormal activists
1891 Great East Thompson Train Wreck, East Thompson, Connecticut; 2 killed plus hundreds injured. First of only two U.S. rail disasters to involve four different trains
1893 Chester train wreck, Chester, Massachusetts; At least 14 killed
1896 Atlantic City rail crash, Atlantic City, New Jersey; 50 killed plus ~60 injured
1897 Garrison train crash, Garrison, New York; 19 killed. Encouraged increases in track inspections

20th century

1900s
1900 Casey Jones's final run, Vaughan, Mississippi; 1 killed (Jones); everyone else escaped with varying degrees of injury. Inspired several different ballads about the incident
1900 Camp Creek train wreck, McDonough, Georgia; 39 killed. Bodies of many dead were brought to McDonough Town Square for identification; local folklore claims this has resulted in it being haunted ever since
1900 Tacoma Streetcar Disaster, Tacoma, Washington; 43 killed plus 65 injured
1901 Buffalo Bill Show train wreck, Lexington, North Carolina; no human deaths but well over 100 show animals killed. This likely led to the demise of "Buffalo Bill" Cody's Wild West Show Tours.
1902 Park Avenue Tunnel (railroad) collision, New York City; 15 killed plus 30+ injured. Led to the construction of the current Grand Central Terminal and electrification of all rail lines in New York City
1902 Mountain Lake (New York) railroad wreck, Gloversville, New York; 14 killed. The little electric railroad known for its scenic tourism never recovered and was eventually removed altogether
1903 Esmond Train Wreck, Esmond, Arizona; 14 killed. Remains Arizona's deadliest rail disaster to date
1903 Wreck of the Old 97, Danville, Virginia; 11 killed. What is possibly Virgina's deadliest rail disaster to date inspired the famous ballad of the same name sung by many famous musicians
1903 Purdue Wreck, Indianapolis, Indiana; 17 killed. Devastated Purdue University's Football team for the year, who are honored before every game to this day.
1903 Connellsville train wreck, Connellsville, Pennsylvania; 64 killed plus 68 injured
1904 Jackson rail disaster, Jackson, Utah; 30+ killed. Most of town was leveled altogether
1904 Eden train wreck, Pueblo, Colorado; 88 confirmed killed plus scores missing. Colorado's deadliest rail disaster to date
1904 New Market train wreck, New Market, Tennessee; 60+ killed plus 100+ injured
1905 Ninth Avenue derailment, New York City; 13 killed plus 48 injured. Deadliest accident on New York's elevated railways
1905 Baker Bridge train wreck, Lincoln, Massachusetts; 17 killed plus 33 injured. Led RR commission to encourage railroads and street railways where trains or cars followed each other in quick succession to implement a signalling block system
1906 Cimarron River bridge disaster, Dover, Oklahoma; 4 confirmed fatalities plus scores unaccounted for
1906 Atlantic City train wreck, Atlantic City, New Jersey; 53 killed. Resulted in what is likely the first known press release by a private entity
1906 Woodville Train Wreck, Porter County, Indiana; at least 48 confirmed killed plus many missing and at least 81 confirmed injured
1906 Washington, D.C., train wreck; 53 killed plus 70 injured. Led to a complete U.S. ban on wooden coach construction; the accident is notoriously described in Frank Kuntz's book Undergraduate Days 1904-1908
1907 Southern Pacific Sunset Express derailment, Colton, California; 24 killed
1907 Pere Marquette Railway wreck, Salem, Michigan; 31 killed plus 101 injured. Remains the state of Michigan's deadliest rail disaster to date
1907 Boston & Maine collision, Canaan, New Hampshire; 25 killed plus 25 injured. New Hampshire's deadliest rail disaster to date
1908 Metz Fire and derailment, Metz Township, Michigan; 26 killed
1909 The Chicago Lake Shore and South Bend Railway wreck, Porter County, Indiana; 12-14 killed plus ~40 injured

1910s
1910 FW&WV (Indiana Railroad) collision, Kingsland, Indiana; 35-40 killed. Worst interurban Trolley disaster in U.S history
1910 Wellington avalanche, Wellington, Washington; 96 killed. The worst avalanche in U.S. history destroyed two trains and a rail depot
1910 Green Mountain train wreck, Green Mountain, Iowa; 52 killed plus scores injured. Remains the state of Iowa's deadliest rail disaster to date
1911 Indianola train wreck, McCook, Nebraska; 18 killed plus 32 injured. Nebraska's deadliest rail disaster to date
1911 Federal Express (train) wreck, Bridgeport, Connecticut; 14 killed. Train was transporting the St. Louis Cardinals baseball team
1912 Corning train wreck, Corning (Gibson), New York; 39 killed plus 88 injured. Strongly encouraged use of automatic block signaling and led to mandatory use of steel coaches for high speed passenger rail service
1912 Ligonier Valley Railroad Wilpen disaster, Wilpen Fairgrounds, Pennsylvania; 26 killed plus 29 injured
1913 Bar Harbor Express-White Mountain Express collision, New Haven, Connecticut; 21 killed
1914 Missouri and North Arkansas Railroad/Kansas City Southern Railway collision, Tipton Ford, Missouri; 43 killed plus 38 injured. Possibly Missouri's deadliest rail disaster to date
1916 Summer Street Bridge disaster, Boston, Massachusetts; 46 killed. Deadliest disaster in Boston's history up to that point and still remains the city's deadliest transport-oriented disaster.
1917 Frisco collision, Kellyville, Oklahoma; 23 killed along with many cattle plus 80 injured. Remains the state of Oklahoma's deadliest rail disaster to date
1917 Shepherdsville train wreck, Shepherdsville, Kentucky; ~50 killed. Remains the state of Kentucky's deadliest rail disaster to date
1918 Hammond Circus Train Wreck, Gary/Hammond, Indiana; 86 killed plus 127 injured. Remains Indiana's deadliest rail disaster to date
1918 Great train wreck of 1918, Nashville, Tennessee; 101 killed plus 171 injured. Officially the deadliest U.S. rail disaster to date
1918 Malbone Street Wreck, New York City; 95-100 killed plus 100+ injured. Remains the deadliest rail disaster in the History of New York state and the New York City Subway
1919 New York Central collision, Byron, New York; 22 killed
1919 Onawa train wreck, Onawa, Maine; 23 killed plus 50 injured. Maine's deadliest rail disaster to date

1920s
1921 Porter Train Wreck, Porter, Indiana; 37 killed plus 100+ injured. Eventually led to the requirement of cab signaling in the U.S.
1921 Bryn Athyn Train Wreck, Bryn Athyn, Pennsylvania; 27 killed plus 70 injured
1922 Winslow Junction train derailment, Winslow Junction, New Jersey; 7 killed plus 89 injured
1922 Missouri Pacific collision, Sulphur Springs, Missouri; 34 killed plus 150 injured
1923 Glenrock train wreck, Glenrock, Wyoming; 30 killed plus 66 injured. Remains the state of Wyoming's deadliest rail disaster to date
1925 Rockport train wreck, Rockport, New Jersey; ~45 killed plus ~25 injured
1925 Granite train wreck, Granite, Colorado; 2 killed plus 107 injured
1925 Frisco derailment, Victoria, Marshall County, Mississippi; ~20 killed
1926 Granite train wreck, Granite, Colorado; ~30 killed plus 54 injured
1926 Ponce de Leon (train)/Royal Palm (train) collision, Rockmart, Georgia; 19 killed plus 113 injured. Inspired the song "The Wreck of the Royal Palm"
1928 Times Square derailment, New York City; 18 killed plus ~100 injured

1930s
1938 Custer Creek train wreck, Saugus, Montana; 47 killed plus 75 injured. Remains the state of Montana's deadliest rail disaster to date
1938 South Jordan bus-train crash, South Jordan, Utah; 24 killed plus 15 injured. Led to state and eventually federal law requiring the practice of school buses stopping to look and listen for trains at grade crossings

1940s
1940 Little Falls Gulf Curve crash, Little Falls, New York; 31 killed plus 51 injured. Led to a realignment to reduce the angle of the curve, which required diverting the Mohawk River farther south and filling in the old channel
1940 Doodlebug disaster, Cuyahoga Falls, Ohio; 43 killed
1942 Exchange Place station (PATH) derailment, Jersey City, New Jersey; 5 killed plus hundreds injured
1943 Lackawanna Limited wreck, Wayland, New York; 29 killed plus 114 injured. Led the Public Service Commission to order the DL&W to install derailing devices as an added safety measure on most sidings connecting to the main lines
1943 Frankford Junction train wreck, Philadelphia, Pennsylvania; 79 killed plus 117 injured. Pennsylvania's deadliest rail disaster to date
1943 Rennert railroad accident, Rennert, North Carolina; 74 killed. North Carolina's deadliest rail disaster to date
1944 Stockton train wreck, Stockton, Georgia; 47 killed plus 41 injured. State of Georgia's deadliest rail disaster to date
1944 "Tragedy on Election Day", Aguadilla, Puerto Rico; 16 killed plus 50 injured. Puerto Rico's deadliest rail disaster to date
1944 Bagley train wreck, Bagley, Utah; ~50 killed plus 79 injured. Utah's deadliest rail disaster to date
1945 Michigan train wreck, Michigan, North Dakota; 34 killed plus hundreds injured. North Dakota's deadliest rail disaster to date
1945 California Limited derailment, Santa Anita, California; 5 killed plus hundreds injured
1946 Naperville train disaster, Naperville, Illinois; 45 killed plus 125 injured. Eventually convinced the Interstate Commerce Commission to rule that trains traveling 80 mph or more must have "an automatic cab signal, automatic train stop or automatic train control system". (Positive Train Control has since been added as an option to the rule post-ICC)
1947 Downers Grove train wreck, Downers Grove, Illinois; 3 killed plus 30 injured

1950s
1950 Rockville Centre train crash, Rockville Centre, New York; 32 killed plus 100+ injured
1950 Chicago streetcar crash, Chicago, Illinois; 34 killed plus 50 injured
1950 The Milwaukee Electric Railway and Light Company Rapid Transit & Speedrail Crash, Greenfield, Wisconsin; 8 killed plus 40 injured
1950 Kew Gardens train crash, New York City; 78 killed plus hundreds injured
1951 Woodbridge train wreck, Woodbridge, New Jersey; ~85 killed plus hundreds injured. New Jersey's deadliest rail disaster to date
1953 New York Central Railroad Accident, Conneaut, Ohio; 21 killed plus 49 injured
1953 Pennsylvania Railroad train wreck; 0 killed but 44 injured; served as inspiration for the ending of Silver Streak (film)
1955 Spring City School bus-train collision, Spring City, Tennessee; 11 killed plus many injured
1956 Redondo Junction train wreck, Los Angeles, California; 30 killed plus 117 injured
1956 Collision of the Chief (train), Springer, New Mexico; 20 killed plus 35 injured. New Mexico's deadliest rail disaster to date
1958 Newark Bay rail accident, Bayonne, New Jersey; 48 killed plus 48 injured
1959 Meldrim trestle disaster, Meldrim, Georgia; 23 killed

1960s
1960 San Francisco Chief Disaster, Bakersfield, California; 17 killed plus ~60 injured
1961 City of Denver-schoolbus collision, Auburn, Colorado; 20 killed plus 16 injured
1962 Steelton train derailment, Steelton, Pennsylvania; 19 killed plus 120+ injured
1963 Chualar bus crash, Chualar, California; 32 killed plus 25 injured
1966 Everett, Massachusetts train crash, Everett, Massachusetts; 13 killed plus 21 injured
1969 New Canaan Branch collision, Darien, Connecticut; 4 killed plus 40 injured

1970s
1971 Salem, Illinois, derailment; 11 killed plus 163 injured
1972 Gilchrest Road, New York crossing accident; 5 killed plus 46 injured
1972 Chicago commuter rail crash, Chicago, Illinois; 45 killed plus hundreds injured
1973 Littlefield, Texas bus/train crash; 7 killed plus 16 injured. Possibly the state of Texas's deadliest rail accident
1974 Decatur tank car explosion, Decatur, Illinois; 7 killed plus hundreds injured
1976 1976 Beckemeyer train accident, 12 killed and four injured.
1976 New Canaan Branch collision, New Canaan, Connecticut; 2 killed plus 29 injured
1977 Chicago Loop derailment, Chicago, Illinois; 11 killed plus 180+ injured
1978 Waverly, Tennessee, tank car explosion; 16 killed plus 43 injured
1979 Southwest Limited (predecessor to the Southwest Chief) derailment, Lawrence, Kansas; 2 killed plus 69 injured
1979 Harvey, Illinois train collision; 2 killed plus 38 injured
1979 Philadelphia Conrail collision, Philadelphia, Pennsylvania; 1 killed plus hundreds injured

1980s
1982 Washington Metro train derailment, Washington, DC; 3 killed plus 25 injured
1984 Montrealer (train) derailment, Williston, Vermont; 5 killed plus 100+ injured
1987 Maryland train collision, Chase, Maryland; 16 killed plus 164 injured
1989 San Bernardino train disaster, San Bernardino, California; 6 killed plus 7 injured

1990s
1990 Market–Frankford Line subway derailment, Philadelphia, Pennsylvania; 4 killed plus 162 injured
1991 Dunsmuir, California derailment; no human deaths but vast numbers of aquatic animals poisoned to death by chemical leak
1991 Lugoff derailment in South Carolina; 8 killed, 76 injured when passenger train derails and coach crashes into freight hopper
1991 Union Square derailment, New York City; 5 killed plus 161 injured
1992 Nemadji River bridge derailment, Superior, Wisconsin; no direct human deaths but many animals—wild and domestic—confirmed killed by chemical leak; 50,000 to 80,000 people evacuated from Superior and from Duluth, Minnesota
1993 Big Bayou Canot rail accident, Mobile, Alabama; 47 killed plus 103 injured. Alabama's deadliest rail disaster to date
1993 Kelso collision, Washington; 5 killed
1995 Fox River Grove bus–train collision, Fox River Grove, Illinois; 7 killed plus 21 injured
1996 Secaucus train collision, Secaucus, New Jersey; 3 killed plus 162 injured
1996 Maryland train collision, Silver Spring, Maryland; 11 killed plus 26 injured
1999 Bourbonnais, Illinois, train crash; 11 killed plus 122 injured

21st century

2002 Minot train derailment, Minot, North Dakota; 1 killed plus hundreds made ill
2002 Placentia train collision, Placentia, California; 2 killed plus 22 injured
2004 Macdona rail disaster, Macdona, Texas; 3 killed plus ~50 made ill
2005 Graniteville train crash, Graniteville, South Carolina; 9 killed plus hundreds made ill. Possibly South Carolina's deadliest rail disaster to date
2005 Anding collision, Mississippi; 4 killed
2005 Metra Rock Island derailment, Chicago, Illinois; 2 killed plus 83 injured
2008 Massachusetts train collision, Newton, Massachusetts; 1 killed plus 12 injured
2008 Chatsworth train collision, Chatsworth, California; 25 killed plus 135 injured
2009 June 2009 Washington Metro train collision, Washington, DC; 9 killed plus 80 injured

2010s
2012 Midland train crash, Midland, Texas; 4 killed plus 16 injured
2012 Goodwell train collision, Oklahoma; 3 killed
2013 December 2013 Spuyten Duyvil derailment, New York City; 4 killed plus 61 injured
2015 Valhalla train crash, Valhalla, New York; 6 killed plus 15 injured
2015 Oxnard train derailment, Oxnard, California; 1 killed plus 29 injured
2015 Philadelphia train derailment, Philadelphia, Pennsylvania; 8 killed plus hundreds injured
2016 Chester, Pennsylvania, train derailment; 2 killed plus 31 injured
2016 Hoboken train crash, Hoboken, New Jersey; 1 killed plus 114 injured
2017 Washington train derailment, DuPont, Washington; 3 killed plus 62 injured
2017 Brooklyn train crash, Brooklyn, New York; 103 injured
2018 Cayce, South Carolina train collision; 2 killed plus 116 injured

2020s
2022 Missouri train derailment, Mendon, Missouri; 4 killed and 150 injured.
2023 Ohio train derailment, East Palestine, Ohio.

See also

Lists of rail accidents
List of rail accidents by country
List of disasters in the United States by death toll
BNSF Railway accidents and incidents

References

America